Common names: Milos viper, Cyclades blunt-nosed viper.

Macrovipera lebetinus schweizeri is a subspecies of venomous snake in the family Viperidae. The subspecies is endemic to the Cyclades Archipelago in the Aegean sea.

Etymology
The subspecific name, schweizeri, is in honor of Swiss herpetologist Hans Schweizer (1891–1975).

Description

Geographic range
Macrovipera lebetinus schweizeri is found on the Greek islands of the Cyclades Archipelago in the Aegean Sea: Milos and the three smaller, adjacent islands of Siphnos, Kimolos and Poliaigos. The type locality is given as "Insel Milos ".

Conservation status
This sublebetinus species, M. schweizeri, is classified as Endangered (EN) according to the IUCN Red List of Threatened Species with the following criteria: B1ab(iii,v) (v3.1, 2001). This indicates that the extent of its occurrence within its geographic range is estimated to be less than 5,000 km² (1,930 sq mi), that its populations are severely fragmented or known to exist at no more than five locations. Furthermore, a continuing decline is observed, inferred or projected in the area, extent and/or quality of habitat, as well as the number of mature individuals.

So listed because its extent of occurrence is, in fact, not much greater than 100 km² (39 sq mi) – it is known from only four small islands. There is continuing decline in the extent and quality of its habitat, and it is experiencing a decline in the number of mature individuals due to persecution and over-collecting. Year assessed: 2009.

It is also listed as strictly protected (Appendix II) under the Berne Convention.

Venom
It is narrated by G.A. Boulenger in his book The Snakes of Europe that "Dr. de Bedriaga observed this much dreaded snake, the bite of which is probably as bad as that of its Indian ally, the Daboia, Vipera russelli ". It is probable that the snake he assumed was Macrovipera lebetina is in fact the Milos Viper.

References

Further reading
Werner F (1935). "Reptilien der Ägäischen Inseln ". Sitzungberichte der Kaiserlichen Akademie der Wissenschaften in Wien 1244: 81–117. (Vipera lebetina schweizeri, new subspecies, p. 117). (in German).

External links

Cyclades blunt-nosed viper (Macrovipera schweizeri) at ARKive. Accessed 26 September 2006.
Macrovipera schweizeri at Amphibians and Reptiles of Europe. Accessed 9 October 2006.
 

Viperinae
Reptiles of Europe
Endemic fauna of Greece
Reptiles described in 1935
Taxa named by Franz Werner